Geoffrey Victor Price Chamberlain (21 April 1930 – October 2014) was a professor and academic head of department of obstetrics and gynaecology at St George's Hospital, London, editor in chief of the British Journal of Obstetrics and Gynaecology and president of the Royal College of Obstetricians and Gynaecologists (RCOG). At one time, he was president of the obstetrics and gynaecology section at the Royal Society of Medicine. He also authored numerous textbooks and journal articles on obstetrics. 

Chamberlain took considerable interest in maternal mortality and frequently presented significant importance to the triennal Confidential Enquiries into Maternal Death Reports. In his role with the National Birthday Trust, he directed four national surveys of British obstetrics.

He resigned from his academic, editorial and presidential posts following his acceptance of a ‘gift authorship’ on a fraudulent research paper written by a colleague. Subsequently, Chamberlain moved to Wales where he published an internationally acclaimed textbook, From Witchcraft to Wisdom, whilst teaching history of medicine as an Apothecaries’ lecturer.

Early life
Geoffrey Chamberlain was born on 21 April 1930 in Cardiff to Albert Victor Chamberlain, the Lord Mayor of Cardiff's secretary, and Irene May Chamberlain née Price.

His early education was at Llandaff Cathedral School, followed by Cowbridge Grammar School, before he went on to University College London to study medicine. His flair at rugby at school earned him the nickname "Bodger".

Medical career
Chamberlain's early appointments included placements at the Royal Postgraduate Medical School, Great Ormond Street Hospital for Children, Queen Charlotte's and Chelsea Hospital for Women, and King's College Hospital, London. Subsequently, between 1965 and 1966, he taught at the George Washington Hospital, Washington DC, USA. It was during these years that he performed his controversial fetal and placental research.

In 1954, he entered the Royal Naval Volunteer Reserve, before retiring in 1974 with the rank of surgeon commander.

He held a consultant post at Queen Charlotte's and Chelsea Hospital for 12 years from 1970. In 1982 he was appointed professor of obstetrics and gynaecology at St George's Hospital Medical School, where he remained until his resignation in 1995.

In 1989, Chamberlain was elected president of the section of obstetrics and gynaecology at the Royal Society of Medicine. Between 1971 and 1994, he was actively involved in several areas of the RCOG, being elected vice-president from 1984 to 1987 and president from 1993 to 1994 and being a member of the council throughout that whole time. He was also academic head of department and editor in chief of the British Journal of Obstetrics and Gynaecology. In 1994, Chamberlain carried out the 1994 Home Birth Study, which demonstrated the safety of planned home births.

Chamberlain took considerable interest in maternal mortality, often recommending GP Irvine Loudon's book, Death in Childbirth, which he described as "first rate", authoring articles on the subject and presenting significant importance to the triennal Confidential Enquiries into Maternal Death Reports. In addition, he directed four national surveys of British obstetrics in his role with the National Birthday Trust.

In 1994, Chamberlain resigned as editor-in-chief of the British Journal of Obstetrics and Gynaecology and as president of the Royal College of Obstetricians and Gynaecologists after unknowingly counter-signing a dishonest report on a fabricated story about a successful transplant of an ectopic fetus into the uterine cavity. The concept of ‘gift authorship’ was not uncommon at the time, where, without contributing, a senior name could appear on a paper. It could have happened in many other journals.

Over the years, Chamberlain had witnessed an increase in attendance of the partner during labour and once said that "the presence of the husband in the labour room has been an advance", they "can act as a referee between midwife, doctor and the woman".

Between 2000 and 2008, he remained at Swansea University as Apothecaries' lecturer in history of medicine. During this time, he produced an internationally successful textbook on the history of obstetrics, From Witchcraft to Wisdom.

Personal and family
Chamberlain appreciated opera and travel. He carved wooden decoy ducks and enjoyed wearing his Dr. Martens.

He married Jocelyn Olivia Kerley in 1956 and together they had five children.

Death and legacy
Chamberlain died in October 2014 at the age of 84.

The Royal College of Obstetricians and Gynaecologists presents the Professor Geoffrey Chamberlain award every three years to outstanding trainees.

Selected publications

References

1930 births
2014 deaths
People from Cardiff
English gynaecologists
English obstetricians
People educated at Cowbridge Grammar School
People educated at The Cathedral School, Llandaff
Royal Navy officers
Alumni of University College London
Fellows of the Royal College of Obstetricians and Gynaecologists
History of surgery
British textbook writers
Royal Naval Volunteer Reserve personnel